Gary Blaine Bredin (born May 25, 1948) is a Canadian retired professional ice hockey forward.

Bredin played in 144 games in the World Hockey Association with the Indianapolis Racers, Michigan Stags, Baltimore Blades, Denver Spurs, Ottawa Civics and San Diego Mariners.

References

External links

1948 births
Living people
Baltimore Blades players
Canadian ice hockey forwards
Denver Spurs (WHA) players
Ice hockey people from Edmonton
Indianapolis Racers players
Michigan Stags players
Ottawa Civics players
San Diego Mariners players